Richard Hoyt Lawrence (July 5, 1942 – November 24, 2022) was an American Republican politician who represented the Caledonia 4 district in the Vermont House of Representatives from 2005 until 2019. He retired and was succeeded in the 2018 election by Patrick Seymour.

Background
Lawrence was born in St. Johnsbury, Vermont,. He lived in Lyndonville, Vermont, and graduated from Lyndon Institute in 1960. He received his bachelor's degree in animal science from University of New Hampshire in 1962. He was involved with the dairy farming at his farm.

Death
Lawrence died on November 24, 2022, at the age of 80.

References

1942 births
2022 deaths
People from Lyndonville, Vermont
People from St. Johnsbury, Vermont
Farmers from Vermont
University of New Hampshire alumni
Republican Party members of the Vermont House of Representatives
21st-century American politicians